Jackes is a surname that may refer to:
 Albert G. Jackes (1844–1888), Canadian politician and medical doctor
 Art Jackes (1924–2000), Canadian high jumper
 Betsy Rivers Jackes (born 1935), Australian botanist
 Franklin Jackes (1804–1852), Canadian baker and politician
 Norway Jackes (1881–1964), Canadian rower

See also
Jakes (surname)